The Hôtel de Ville tram stop is situated on lines  and  of the tramway de Bordeaux. The station serves as a junction for the two lines.

Situation
The station is at the Place Pey-Berland in Bordeaux. The arrival of the tramway has allowed a total reorganization of this area which is now largely pedestrian.

Connections

Close to
 Place Pey-Berland
 Palais Rohan (Hôtel de Ville de Bordeaux)
 Cathédrale Saint-André et la Tour Pey-Berland

See also 
 TBC
 Tramway de Bordeaux

External links
 

Bordeaux tramway stops
Tram stops in Bordeaux
Railway stations in France opened in 2004